Elijah Malik Dixon-Bonner (born 1 January 2001) is an English professional footballer who plays as a midfielder for EFL Championship club Queens Park Rangers.

Club career
Dixon-Bonner was born in Harlow, Essex and began his career with Arsenal joining the club at Under-9 level before moving to Liverpool in 2015 at the age of 14. He moved through the club's under-16 and under-18 levels, and captained the England under-16 team.

In the 2018–19 season, Dixon-Bonner  was part of the victorious FA Youth Cup squad and he scored during the penalty shootout win over Manchester City in the final. He signed his first professional contract with the club in February 2018 and played for the club's under-23 team before signing an extension to his deal in November 2019.

He made his first-team debut on 4 February 2020, as a 90th minute substitute in the FA Cup fourth round replay against Shrewsbury Town.

In the summer of 2021, Dixon-Bonner spent time on trial with Portsmouth, but was not offered a contract. Despite this, he was named in Liverpool's squad for the 2021-22 UEFA Champions League, and featured for the first team in a 2-0 win over Preston North End in the Carabao Cup in October 2021.

In June 2022 it was announced by Liverpool that he would leave the club at the end of the month when his contract expired.

Queens Park Rangers
On 13 October 2022, Dixon-Bonner joined Championship side Queens Park Rangers following a successful trial. He made his debut for the Super Hoops coming on as a 82nd minute substitute for Jamal Lowe in a 0-1 home defeat to Birmingham City on 18th of March 2023..

International career
He has captained England under-16 and was a member of the England under-17 squad that hosted the 2018 UEFA European Under-17 Championship.

Career statistics

Notes

Honours
Liverpool
 FA Youth Cup: 2018–19

References

2001 births
Living people
People from Harlow
English footballers
Arsenal F.C. players
Liverpool F.C. players
Association football midfielders
England youth international footballers
Black British sportspeople
Queens Park Rangers F.C. players